The 1989 Spanish motorcycle Grand Prix was the fourth round of the 1989 Grand Prix motorcycle racing season. It took place on the weekend of 28–30 April 1989 at the Jerez circuit.

500 cc race report
Wayne Rainey on pole goes into the first turn ahead of Pierfrancesco Chili, Eddie Lawson, and Kevin Schwantz. Schwantz wastes little time in catching and passing Rainey. As Schwantz pulls ahead, Rainey battles Lawson for the first time in the season, Lawson seeming to come to terms with the Honda. Rainey can only watch as Lawson passes and claws away at a gap.

Meanwhile, Chili tries passing Ron Haslam on the hairpin leading into the straight by braking late on the inside. Chili clumsily bumps Haslam, who’s in no mood to be shoved and decides to shove back, taking them both off-track, though Haslam’s detour end up being much longer than Chili’s.

Up ahead, Schwantz is enjoying a large lead with 5 laps to go when he throws it away, clutching his head in disbelief as he walks through the gravel. Lawson is handed the win, followed by Rainey and Mackenzie.

Schwantz:
"At Jerez there was four laps to go and I was almost six seconds in front of Eddie. I had watched the race the previous year after the bike broke and I remembered watching him haul in Rainey and keep Rainey from winning his first Grand Prix. I was thinking to myself, come on you've just got to keep above those five seconds. Get it down to less than five laps with more than five seconds and there's no way he can catch you.' "

"I had got there and done that. I went over the line and around the back of the big Kodak box that is a scoreboard with all the times on it. As I went past the back it changed to show four laps to go and more than five seconds, I thought, 'yeah I've got it,' and immediately fell off. It was just a loss of concentration, I thought I had it in the bag. I went into the corner, didn't have it down on my knee where I needed to be. The front end pushed and before I could even think, 'Oh shit', I was sitting on the haybales."

The gap between Lawson and Rainey is now 10 points.

500 cc classification

References

Spanish motorcycle Grand Prix
Spanish
Motorcycle